Raul Diogo Souza Rocha (born November 9, 1985, in Poço Verde), simply known as Raul, is a Brazilian footballer who plays as left back for Vitória da Conquista.

Career

Lagarto
In December 2019, Raul signed with Lagarto Futebol Clube for the 2020 season. However, after five games for the club, it was reported on 12 February 2020 that he had left the club again.

Career statistics

References

External links

1985 births
Living people
Brazilian footballers
Association football defenders
Campeonato Brasileiro Série A players
Campeonato Brasileiro Série B players
Campeonato Brasileiro Série C players
Campeonato Brasileiro Série D players
Votoraty Futebol Clube players
Esporte Clube Bahia players
América Futebol Clube (MG) players
Atlético Clube Goianiense players
Guarani FC players
Oeste Futebol Clube players
Central Sport Club players
Esporte Clube Santo André players
Associação Ferroviária de Esportes players
Mirassol Futebol Clube players
Centro Sportivo Alagoano players
Ituano FC players
Sampaio Corrêa Futebol Clube players
Lagarto Futebol Clube players
Villa Nova Atlético Clube players
Esporte Clube Primeiro Passo Vitória da Conquista players